{{DISPLAYTITLE:2 51 honeycomb}}

In 8-dimensional geometry, the 251 honeycomb is a space-filling uniform tessellation. It is composed of 241 polytope and 8-simplex facets arranged in an 8-demicube vertex figure. It is the final figure in the 2k1 family.

Construction

It is created by a Wythoff construction upon a set of 9 hyperplane mirrors in 8-dimensional space.

The facet information can be extracted from its Coxeter-Dynkin diagram.
 

Removing the node on the short branch leaves the 8-simplex. 
 

Removing the node on the end of the 5-length branch leaves the 241. 
 

The vertex figure is determined by removing the ringed node and ringing the neighboring node. This makes the 8-demicube, 151.
 

The edge figure is the vertex figure of the vertex figure. This makes the rectified 7-simplex, 051.

Related polytopes and honeycombs

References
 Coxeter The Beauty of Geometry: Twelve Essays, Dover Publications, 1999,  (Chapter 3: Wythoff's Construction for Uniform Polytopes)
 Coxeter Regular Polytopes (1963), Macmillan Company
 Regular Polytopes, Third edition, (1973), Dover edition,  (Chapter 5: The Kaleidoscope)
 Kaleidoscopes: Selected Writings of H.S.M. Coxeter, edited by F. Arthur Sherk, Peter McMullen, Anthony C. Thompson, Asia Ivic Weiss, Wiley-Interscience Publication, 1995,  
 (Paper 24) H.S.M. Coxeter, Regular and Semi-Regular Polytopes III, [Math. Zeit. 200 (1988) 3-45]

9-polytopes